The Milano Hotel, at 38300 California Highway 1, South, about a mile north of Gualala, California, was built in 1905.  It was listed on the National Register of Historic Places in 1978.

Construction was supervised by, and it was run as a hotel, saloon, and dining room, by Italian immigrant Batiste Luchinetti.  It was built on cliffs facing the Pacific Ocean between Gualala and Bowens Landing, California.  (Bowen's Landing was a lumber port / doghole port about 86 miles north of San Francisco.)

It survived the 1906 San Francisco earthquake with bottles being broken at its bar.

It is "flat front Italianate" in style.

A carriage shed and a small barn are two additional contributing buildings in the listing.

References

Hotels in California
National Register of Historic Places in Mendocino County, California
Italianate architecture in California
Buildings and structures completed in 1905
1905 establishments in California